Segambut may refer to:
Segambut
Segambut (federal constituency), represented in the Dewan Rakyat